Felimare amalguae is a species of sea slug, a dorid nudibranch, a shell-less marine gastropod mollusk in the family Chromodorididae.

Distribution 
This species was described from Isla Cedros, Mexico, in the eastern Pacific Ocean,  and nearby San Benito.

Description

Ecology

References

Chromodorididae
Gastropods described in 1988